Bewadze is a community on the Kasoa-Cape Coast highway in the Gomoa West District in the Central Region of Ghana. Vegetables are produced in the community.

Facilities 

 Bewadze Fuel Service Station
 Casa De Ropa. a food processing factory

References 

Central Region (Ghana)
Communities in Ghana